Skaugum is an estate, manor house and the official residence of Crown Prince Haakon of Norway and his wife Crown Princess Mette-Marit.

History
The estate was originally Church property during the Middle Ages, and passed through several owners until 1909, when Fritz Wedel Jarlsberg bought it. When Crown Prince Olav and Crown Princess Märtha were married in 1929, Wedel-Jarlsberg sold it to the couple. In 1937, Prince Harald was born on the estate. 

Wedel-Jarlsberg's Swiss chalet style-residence, designed by Herman Backer and completed in 1891, burned to the ground in 1930. The Norwegian architect Arnstein Arneberg was commissioned to design a new structure, entirely on the foundations of the old building. The new building was also built of stone to avoid future fires.

Second World War

During the Nazi occupation of Norway,  SS-General Wilhelm Rediess resided at Skaugum for a short period while Reichskommissar Josef Terboven later would make the estate his official residence in June 1940. Shortly after Hitler's death, Terboven was dismissed from his position by Karl Dönitz and committed suicide in the manor bunker on 8 May 1945 by blowing himself up with fifty kilograms of dynamite.

Residence of the heir apparent

In 1968, King Olav V gave the estate as a wedding gift to his son Crown Prince Harald (later King Harald V) and his wife Crown Princess Sonja, while the King himself relocated to the Royal Palace in Oslo. King Harald would repeat this gesture, giving the estate as a wedding gift to his son, Crown Prince Haakon, and his wife, Crown Princess Mette-Marit when the couple married in 2001. 

Unlike the Royal Palace and Oscarshall, Skaugum is owned privately by the royal family and is therefore not open to the public. Like all royal residences in Norway, the estate is protected by the Royal Guards.

Gallery

See also
  Semsvannet and vicinity - millennial site
 List of official residences

References

External links
 Skaugum Estate page at the official Norwegian Royal website

Asker
Royal residences in Norway
Palaces in Norway
Manor houses in Norway